Manama High School is a Lutheran mission school at Manama in Gwanda District, Zimbabwe.

The school has a successful girls' football team, which competed in the Norway Cup in 2010.

References

High schools in Zimbabwe
Education in Matabeleland South Province
Gwanda District